No. 6 (2011) is the sixth studio album by Swedish singer-songwriter Patrik Isaksson. It is also the latest album release from Isaksson.

Track listing
"Mitt Stockholm"
"Han liknar mig"
"Du var den som jag saknat"
"Säg mig"
"Mirakel"
"Septemberljus"
"Pojken med en lysande framtid"
"Ett betongbarn har hittat hem"
"Farväl döda stad"
"Sanningsspegeln"
"Min historia"
"Åh fina"

Charts

References

External links

2011 albums
Patrik Isaksson (singer) albums
Swedish-language albums